Sandra Joan Dawson (born 2 November 1970) is an Australian former middle-distance runner who competed mainly in the 800 metres. She won the Australian Championships 800m title in 1994 and 1995, and reached the 800m final at the 1994 Commonwealth Games.

International competitions

References

1970 births
Living people
Athletes (track and field) at the 1994 Commonwealth Games
Australian female middle-distance runners
Commonwealth Games competitors for Australia
20th-century Australian women
21st-century Australian women